Martina is a rural locality (a village) in Yorgvinskoye Rural Settlement, Kudymkarsky District, Perm Krai, Russia. The population was 62 as of 2010.

Geography 
Martina is located 18 km north of Kudymkar (the district's administrative centre) by road. Alekova is the nearest rural locality.

References 

Rural localities in Kudymkarsky District